The 1976 Cardiff City Council election was held on Thursday 6 May 1976 to elect councillors to Cardiff District Council (later to become known as Cardiff City Council) in Cardiff, Wales. It took place on the same day as other district council elections in the United Kingdom.
This was the second election to the district council.

The previous Cardiff City Council elections took place in 1973 and the next full elections took place in 1979.

The 1976 election saw the Labour Party lose their majority to the Conservative Party.

Background
206 Candidates from 6 parties ran.
No party ran a full slate of candidates. The Conservative Party ran 73 candidates, the Labour Party ran 69 candidates, Plaid Cymru ran 33 candidates  and the Liberal Party ran 21 candidates.

Results
Contests took place in all except one of the wards at this election.

|}

Results by ward

Adamsdown

Canton

Cathays

Central

Ely

Gabalfa

Grangetown

Lisvane, Llanedeyrn and St Mellons

Llandaff

Llanishen

Penylan

Plasmawr

Plasnewydd

Radyr, St Fagans, Tongwynlais

Rhiwbina

Riverside

Roath

Rumney

South

Splott

Whitchurch

References

Cardiff
Council elections in Cardiff
Council elections in South Glamorgan
1970s in Cardiff